Real Fiction (lit. "State of Reality") is a 2000 crime-drama film from South Korean director Kim Ki-duk. It stars Joo Jin-mo, Kim Jin-ah and Son Min-seok. It was shot entirely in real-time, with no retakes, on a mixture of low quality video and purposefully "dirtied" film. The film was entered into the 23rd Moscow International Film Festival.

Plot
Real Fiction follows a South Korean artist as he systematically seeks out, and then kills his real or imagined enemies.

References

External links
 

2000 films
2000 crime drama films
Films directed by Kim Ki-duk
South Korean independent films
2000s Korean-language films
South Korean crime drama films
2000 independent films
2000s South Korean films